Evelien Bosmans (born 9 November 1989) is a Belgian actress. She appeared in more than twenty films since 2010.

Selected filmography

References

External links 

1989 births
Living people
Belgian film actresses
People from Mol, Belgium